Jacob Bernays (11 September 182426 May 1881) was a German philologist and philosophical writer.

Life
Jacob Bernays was born in Hamburg to Jewish parents. His father, Isaac Bernays (1792–1849) was a man of wide culture and the first orthodox German rabbi to preach in the vernacular; his brother, Michael Bernays, was also a distinguished scholar.

Between 1844 and 1848, Bernays studied at the University of Bonn, whose philological school, under Friedrich Gottlieb Welcker and Friedrich Wilhelm Ritschl (of whom Bernays became the favourite pupil), was the best in Germany.

In 1853, he accepted the chair of classical philology at the newly founded Jewish Theological Seminary of Breslau, where he formed a close friendship with Theodor Mommsen. In 1866, when Ritschl left Bonn for Leipzig, Bernays returned to his old university as extraordinary professor and chief librarian. He remained in Bonn until his death on 26 May 1881.  Upon his death, he bequeathed his Hebrew library to the Jewish Theological Seminary of Breslau.

Scholarship
Bernays was most famous for his book Grundzüge der verlorenen Abhandlung des Aristoteles über Wirkung der Tragödie. His medical interpretation of catharsis greatly influenced Friedrich Nietzsche and Sigmund Freud.

Bernays was the first scholar to suggest that Aristotle's Protrepticus inspired Cicero to write the Hortensius. He further suggested that the Hortensius should be used as the base by which the Protrepticus could be reconstructed.

Works
His chief works, which deal mainly with the Greek philosophers, are:
Die Lebensbeschreibung des J.J. Scaliger (1855)
Über das Phokylidische Gesicht (1856)
Grundzüge der verlorenen Abhandlung des Aristoteles über Wirkung der Tragödie (1857)
Die Chronik des Sulpicius Severus (1861)
Die Dialoge des Aristoteles im Verhältniss zu seinen übrigen Werken (1863)
Theophrastos' Schrift über Frömmigkeit (1866)
Die Heraklitischen Briefe (1869)
Lucian und die Cyniker (1879)
Zwei Abhandlungen über die Aristotelische Theorie des Dramas (1880).

The last of these was a republication of his Grundzüge der verlorenen Abhandlungen des Aristoteles über die Wirkung der Tragödie (1857), which aroused considerable controversy.

See also
Protrepticus (Aristotle)
Hortensius (Cicero)

Notes

References
Notices in Biographisches Jahrbuch für Alterthumskunde (1881), and Allgemeine Deutsche Biographie, xlvi. (1902)
article in the Jewish Encyclopedia
John Edwin Sandys, History of Class. Schol. iii. I 76 (1908).
Arnaldo Momigliano, Jacob Bernays, in Id., Pagine ebraiche, a cura di Silvia Berti, Einaudi, Torino 1987, pp. 167–180.
Bollack, Jean, Ein Mensch zwischen zwei Welten: der Philologe Jacob Bernays. Goettingen: Wallstein Verlag, 2009.
Du, von dem ich lebe! Letters to Paul Heyse. Ed. W. M.Calder III & Timo, Günther.  Wallstein, Göttingen 2010.
Ugolini, Gherardo. Jacob Bernays e l’interpretazione medico-omeopatica della catarsi tragica. Con traduzione del saggio di Bernays, Grundzüge der verlorenen Abhandlung des Aristoteles über Wirkung der Tragödie (1857), Cierre Grafica, Verona 2012. 

Attribution

External links
 Signature of Jacob Bernays (Rare Books of the Shimeon Brisman Collection in Jewish Studies, Washington University)

1824 births
1881 deaths
German philologists
19th-century German Jews
Writers from Hamburg
University of Bonn alumni
Academic staff of the University of Bonn
German librarians
Members of the Göttingen Academy of Sciences and Humanities